Mallocephala is a genus of moths in the subfamily Arctiinae. The genus was described by Blanchard in 1852. Both species are found in Chile.

Species
Mallocephala rubripes Blanchard, 1852
Mallocephala fulvicollis (Hampson, 1905)

References

External links

Arctiini
Moths of South America
Endemic fauna of Chile